Mastax okavango is a species of beetle in the family Carabidae with restricted distribution in the Botswana.

References

Mastax okavango
Beetles of Africa
Beetles described in 1988